The Next Karate Kid is a 1994 American martial arts drama film, and the fourth installment in The Karate Kid franchise, following The Karate Kid Part III (1989). It stars Hilary Swank as Julie Pierce (in her first theatrical appearance in a starring role) and Pat Morita as Mr. Miyagi.

The Next Karate Kid was directed by Christopher Cain, written by Mark Lee, produced by Jerry Weintraub, and with music by Bill Conti. It is the first film in the series not to feature Ralph Macchio in the lead role as Daniel LaRusso, and was released on August 12, 1994.

Plot

Mr. Miyagi travels to Arlington National Cemetery for a commendation for Japanese-Americans who fought in the 442nd Regimental Combat Team during World War II. He meets Louisa Pierce, the widow of his commanding officer Jack Pierce, and they both listen to the opening speech given by Senator Daniel Inouye.<ref>[https://scholar.lib.vt.edu/VA-news/VA-Pilot/issues/1994/vp940915/09150055.htm FEMININE ``KARATE KID IS HEAVY-HANDED]</ref>

At Pierce's home in Boston, they catch up. Miyagi is also introduced to Pierce's granddaughter, Julie, a teen struggling with anger issues due to her parents' death in a car accident. Her behavior has led to friction between Julie and her grandmother, along with her fellow students and teachers. She sneaks into the school at night to care for an injured Harris's hawk named "Angel", which she keeps in a pigeon coop on the roof.

Miyagi invites Louisa to stay at his house in Los Angeles to enjoy peace and quiet tending his garden while he remains in Boston as Julie's caretaker. At school, Julie meets and befriends Eric McGowen, a teenage security guard-in-training and a pledge for a shady school security fraternity, the Alpha Elite. The members are taught to enforce the school rules, mostly using physical force, by a self-styled colonel, Paul Dugan. His toughest and most aggressive student is the short-fused Ned Randall, who makes unwelcome sexual advances upon Julie.

When Julie survives almost being hit by a car by jumping into a tiger position, she finally learns to confide in Miyagi when he recognizes her skill. She reveals she was taught karate by her father, who learned from her grandfather, Miyagi's student.

While trying to feed Angel one night, Julie is detected by the Alpha Elite who chase her through the school. Although she escapes them, she is arrested by the police and gets suspended for two weeks by Dugan. Miyagi uses this time to take Julie to a Buddhist monastery to teach her the true ways of karate and how to handle her anger issues. Julie learns through direct lessons about balance, coordination, awareness and respect for all life. She befriends the monks, who eventually have a birthday party for her, giving her a cake and an arrow that Miyagi had caught in mid-flight in a demonstration of Zen archery. They also concede to her wish that they visit her in Boston, where they go bowling with Miyagi. A local player challenges them, loses the match, and accepts their tutelage in how to bowl a strike blind.

Upon returning to school, Julie discovers that Angel was found by Ned who called animal control. Miyagi assists Julie in releasing the bird back to the wild, using the pain suppression technique from the first film to heal her broken wing. In preparation for the prom, Miyagi teaches Julie how to dance, and buys her a dress. Julie goes to the prom with Eric, but under Dugan's orders, the Alpha Elite bungee jump in. When one of the members breaks his arm, Eric shows concern, but Ned tells him to stay out of it.

Eric drives Julie home and kisses her. Ned follows them and smashes the windows of Eric's car with a baseball bat. Ned challenges him to a fight at the docks, and is joined there by Dugan and the Alpha Elite. They set fire to Eric's car and severely beat him, but he is saved by Julie and Miyagi. Ned tries to grab Julie, but she challenges him to a fight. She holds her own, using the karate she has learned, even when Ned throws sand in her face. Julie defeats Ned and turns her back on him. Dugan bullies the rest of the group to continue the fight, but they refuse. Miyagi challenges Dugan to fight and wins, leading the Alpha Elite to abandon him. The film concludes with Angel flying freely above the water.

Cast

 Noriyuki "Pat" Morita as Mr. Miyagi
 Hilary Swank as Julie Pierce
 Michael Ironside as Colonel Paul Dugan
 Constance Towers as Louisa Pierce
 Chris Conrad as Eric McGowen
 Arsenio 'Sonny' Trinidad as Abbot Monk
 Michael Cavalieri as Ned Randall
 Walton Goggins as Charlie
 Senator Daniel Inouye as Himself (cameo)
 Frank Welker as Angel the Hawk (voice)

Reception The Next Karate Kid was critically panned upon release in 1994, although many critics praised Swank’s performance, and it is still considered to be her breakout role.

At the review aggregator website Rotten Tomatoes, it holds an approval of 7% with an average score of 3.70/10 based on 27 reviews. The website's critical consensus reads: "The Next Karate Kid is noteworthy for giving audiences the chance to see a pre-Oscars Hilary Swank, but other than a typically solid performance from Pat Morita, this unnecessary fourth installment in the franchise has very little to offer". On Metacritic, the film has a weighted average score of 36 out of 100, based on 15 critics, indicating "generally unfavorable reviews". Audiences polled by CinemaScore gave the film an average grade of "B+" on an A+ to F scale.The Next Karate Kid was the least successful movie of the series at the domestic box office. The total box office gross for The Next Karate Kid was $8.9 million ($16.71 million when adjusted for 2021 inflation), compared to $90.8 million ($247.27 million in 2021) for the original, $115.1 million ($274.72 million in 2021) for Part II, $38.9 million ($80.75 million in 2021) for Part III, and $171.8 million ($217.01 million in 2021) for the 2010 Karate Kid.Year-end lists
 Dishonorable mention – Dan Craft, The PantagraphHome media
The film was released on DVD on August 28, 2001. A manufacture-on-demand Blu-ray release was released on September 6, 2016, as part of Sony's Choice Collection. It was later reissued as a "double feature" Blu-ray with The Karate Kid Part III'' by Mill Creek Entertainment on January 8, 2019.

See also

List of female action heroes and villains

References

External links

Official trailer
 
 
 
 
 How Julie Pierce Paved The Way - Character Analysis/Theory, April 30, 2021

1990s action drama films
1990s teen drama films
1994 drama films
1994 films
1994 martial arts films
American coming-of-age films
American martial arts films
American teen drama films
American teen films
American sequel films
Columbia Pictures films
1990s English-language films
Films about school bullying
Films directed by Christopher Cain
Films scored by Bill Conti
Films set in 1994
Films set in Boston
Films shot in Massachusetts
Karate films
The Karate Kid (franchise) films
1990s American films